Hippolyte Roussel (22 March 1824 in La Ferté-Macé – 22 January 1898 in Gambier Islands) was a French priest and missionary to Polynesia, a member of the Congregation of the Sacred Hearts of Jesus and Mary.

In 1854 he was sent to evangelize in the Tuamotus and Mangareva in the Gambier Islands.  He was removed from his post in Mangareva because of his "strident pronouncements", and in 1866 was appointed to lead a new mission to Easter Island, with Eugène Eyraud, who died shortly thereafter.  During his stay on Easter Island, he compiled notes on the customs and traditions of the islanders, which he sent to Valparaíso in 1869 and which were published in April and June 1926 in the Annals of the Sacred Hearts of Picpus.

In 1871, after conflict with the manager of the Brander plantation, Jean-Baptiste Dutrou-Bornier, he was forced to leave Easter Island, and took 275 islanders with him, leaving only 230 Rapanui on the island.  He went to Rikitea on Mangareva with 168 Rapanui, and led the mission there until his death in 1898. He periodically returned to Easter Island including in 1882-83 to appoint Atamu Tekena as the island's king.

References

 CHAUVET, Stéphen-Charles. 1935. L'île de Pâques et ses mystères ("Easter Island and its Mysteries"). Paris: Éditions Tel. (An online English version translated by Ann Altman and edited by Shawn McLaughlin is available www.chauvet-translation.com here.)

External links
Easter Island Foundation sells an English translation of Roussel's notes, along with those of Eugène Eyraud, Pierre Loti and Alphonse Pinart, under the title Early Visitors to Easter Island 1864-1877.

French Roman Catholic missionaries
Roman Catholic missionaries in Easter Island
Roman Catholic missionaries in French Polynesia
Picpus Fathers
1824 births
1898 deaths
French expatriates in Ecuador